Margarita Saldaña Hernández (born 19 February 1964) is a Mexican politician affiliated with the PAN. As of 2013 she served as Deputy of both the LIX and LXII Legislatures of the Mexican Congress representing the Federal District.

References

1964 births
Living people
People from Mexico City
Women members of the Chamber of Deputies (Mexico)
National Action Party (Mexico) politicians
21st-century Mexican politicians
21st-century Mexican women politicians
Deputies of the LXII Legislature of Mexico
Members of the Chamber of Deputies (Mexico) for Mexico City